Grey, originally formed as Greymouth, is a former parliamentary electorate in the West Coast region of New Zealand. The electorate of Greymouth was created for the 1881 general election, and lasted until 1890. In 1890 the Grey electorate was created, and was abolished in 1919.

Population centres
Throughout the electorate's history, the town of Greymouth was always included in its area. The town of Brunner belonged to the electorate during most periods.

History
Greymouth was represented from the 1881 general election by Joseph Petrie. He was defeated in the 1884 general election by Arthur Guinness, who represented the electorate (renamed in 1890 as Grey) until his death in 1913.

After the resulting 1913 by-election, the electorate was represented from 1916 to 1919 by two radical politicians from the West Coast coal mines representing the Labour Party or its predecessors. They were Paddy Webb, who was imprisoned in 1918, and Harry Holland, who represented Grey from the by-election on 29 May 1918 until 16 December 1919 when the electorate was abolished.

Members of Parliament
The various electorates were represented by four members of parliament. From 1881 to 1890, Greymouth was a single-member electorate, renamed as Grey from 1890 to 1919.

Key

Election results

1918 by-election

1913 by-election, first ballot

1913 by-election, second ballot

1899 election

1893 election

1890 election

1884 election

Notes

References

Historical electorates of New Zealand
Grey District
Politics of the West Coast, New Zealand
1881 establishments in New Zealand
1919 disestablishments in New Zealand